Zwerger is a German surname. Notable people with the surname include:

Dominic Zwerger (born 1996), Austrian ice hockey player
 (1824–1893), Austrian priest
Lisbeth Zwerger (born 1954), Austrian illustrator

German-language surnames